Saints Cyprian and Justina are honored in the Catholic Church, Eastern Orthodox Church and Oriental Orthodoxy as Christians of Antioch, who in 304, during the Diocletianic Persecution, suffered martyrdom at Nicomedia (modern-day İzmit, Turkey) on September 26. According to Roman Catholic sources, no Bishop of Antioch bore the name of Cyprian.

Origin
The story must have arisen as early as the 4th century, as it is mentioned by both St. Gregory Nazianzen and Prudentius; both, nevertheless, have conflated Cyprian with St. Cyprian of Carthage, a mistake often repeated. The attempt has been made to find in Cyprian a mystical prototype of the Faustian legend. The legend is given in Greek and Latin in Acta SS. September, VII. Ancient Syriac and Ethiopic versions of it have been published. Their story is told in the Golden Legend. 

The outline of the legend or allegory is found with diffuse descriptions and dialogues in the unreliable Symeon Metaphrastes and was made the subject of a poem by Empress Aelia Eudocia.

Legend

Cyprian, known by the title of "the Magician", to distinguish him from Cyprian, Bishop of Carthage, received a liberal education in his youth, and particularly applied himself to astrology; after which he traveled for improvement through Greece, Egypt, India, etc.<ref name=tow>"The Lives of Sts. Cyprian and Justina", The Orthodox Word, Vol. 12, No. 5 (70) (September-October, 1976), pp. 135-142, 167-176</ref> Cyprian was a magician in Antioch and dealt in sorcery. 

Justina is known for converting Cyprian, and is said to have been a young woman who took private vows of chastity. She was killed during the persecutions of the Roman emperor Diocletian in the year 304 AD. 

A would-be suitor – a pagan lawyer – sought the aid of Cyprian's magic to induce Justina into marrying him. Cyprian sent a demon to torment Justina, hoping to arouse carnal passions within her. The charms and spells had no effect on Justina, who, in chastity and purity, spent her time in prayer and fasting. Cyprian again employed sorcery, sending "the chief of the demons" to Justina, who likewise was conquered by a certain "Sign of Christ". Brought to despair, Cyprian made the Sign himself and in this way was freed from the toils of Satan. Cyprian summarily burned any books of spells and sorcery in his possession in front of a bishop of the Church, sealing his commitment to a new life as a Christian. He was baptized and received into the Church and was made preeminent by miraculous gifts. Cyprian then became, in succession, a deacon, priest, and finally, bishop after being named as the successor to Anthimus, bishop of Antioch, while Justina became abbess of a convent.

During the Diocletian Persecution, both were seized and taken to Damascus, where they were tortured. As their faith never wavered, they were brought before Diocletian at Nicomedia, where at his command they were beheaded on the bank of the Gallus River, a tributary of the Sakarya River. The same fate befell a man named Theoctistus, who upon observing Cyprian's faith, declared himself a Christian.
After the bodies of the saints had lain unburied for six days, they were taken by Christian sailors to Rome, where they were interred on the estate of a noble lady named Rufina and later entombed in Constantine's basilica. 

Justina is mentioned in Foxe's Book of Martyrs. It was under the 10th Persecution in 303 AD while Diocletian was Emperor of Rome. It says:
" In the course of time he [Cyprian] became acquainted with Justina, a young lady of Antioch, whose birth, beauty, and accomplishments, rendered her the admiration of all who knew her. A pagan gentleman applied to Cyprian, to promote his suit with the beautiful Justina; this he undertook, but soon himself converted, burnt his books of astrology and magic, received baptism, and felt animated with a powerful spirit of grace. The conversion of Cyprian had a great effect on the pagan gentleman who paid his addresses to Justina, and he in a short time embraced Christianity. During the persecutions of Diocletian, Cyprian and Justina were seized upon as Christians, the former was torn with pincers, and the latter chastised; and, after suffering other torments, both were beheaded."

Veneration and liturgical celebration
Their feast day appeared in the General Roman Calendar of Roman Rite from the thirteenth century until it was deleted in 1969 because of the lack of historical evidence of their existence. Their names were also removed from the 2001 revision of the Roman Martyrology, the official but professedly incomplete list of saints recognized by the Roman Catholic Church. The Roman Martyrology, however, includes five other saints called Cyprian and two named Justina. Some traditionalist Catholics continue to observe their feast based on pre-1970 versions of the Roman Calendar.

In popular culture
The Spanish author, Pedro Calderón de la Barca, took the story as the basis of a drama: El mágico prodigioso. In 2005, American author Tono Rondone published a novel, The Martyrs, which is a continuation of this tradition.The Great Book of Saint Cyprian is full of prayers and spells, and is widely sold in the Portuguese- and Spanish-speaking world.Cyprianus is a popular name for a grimoire in Scandinavian folklore.

See also

 List of Christians martyred during the reign of Diocletian

 References 

External links
 The martyrdom of Cyprian and Justa (1903). By Edgar J. Goodspeed. In Historical and linguistic studies in literature related to the New Testament, First series, Volume I, part 2 (1903).
 The confession and martyrdom of Cyprian (2021). By Anthony Alcock.
September 26: SS. Cyprian and Justina, Martyrs from Fr. Alban Butler's Lives of the Saints''
 Saints Justina ... and Cyprian at the Christian Iconography web site
 St. Justina, Caxton's translation of Golden Legend #142

3rd-century births
304 deaths
Groups of Roman Catholic saints
Saints duos
Magic (supernatural)
4th-century Christian saints
Late Ancient Christian female saints
Christians martyred during the reign of Diocletian